The Dead Alewives was an improvisational comedy troupe during the 1980s and 1990s from Milwaukee. Some of the group's individual members went on to become noteworthy after the group's breakup.

The Dead Alewives began as a splinter group from the Milwaukee-based national comedy organization ComedySportz. The split occurred out of a desire to do a less family-oriented, more uncensored style of improv than the "clean" variety offered by ComedySportz. The group took its name from the local phenomenon of multitudes of dead alewife fish washing up on the shore of Lake Michigan during summers in the mid-1980s. Its shows featured music from local bands during their set breaks.

The Dead Alewives began performing in the ComedySportz theater space in Milwaukee's Third Ward district. They appeared on several theaters in the Milwaukee area  during their existence. Other venues that played host to their shows included Thai Joe's, The Avalon Theatre, and the Miramar Theatre, which is where they wound up their weekly live shows in the late 1990s.

The Dead Alewives did not receive widespread recognition. Their Dungeons and Dragons sketch from the comedy CD Take Down the Grand Master made the rounds on the Internet during the late 1990s. The short was also one of the most requested on the syndicated Dr. Demento radio program. Entertainment Weekly reported that the Dead Alewives had been contacted about a television sketch-comedy series, but it ultimately fell through.

The Dead Alewives ceased their weekly live performances in the late 1990s, and the individual members all pursued other interests.

Founding members
Francis Montgomery "Mondy" Carter was a founding member of the troupe. He lived in Milwaukee for many years and worked as an actor in the city's live theater industry. He moved  with his family to Asheville, North Carolina where he hoped to continue to work on theater projects with his wife, Karen Stobbe.

Robert "Bo" Johnson lives in Milwaukee, and works in theaters in the area. He plays rhythm guitar with Milwaukee-based pop band Random Maxx.

Peter Alberts was a staff member of Fireman Press, the self-contained publishing house that produced the independent comic book Scud: The Disposable Assassin. He lives in Los Angeles.

Rob Schrab. In addition to his tenure with the Dead Alewives, Schrab is a successful artist and writer of comic books and graphic novels, most notably Scud: The Disposable Assassin. When the Dead Alewives folded, Schrab moved to Los Angeles to pursue a pending movie deal for his comic characters. Among his achievements are co-writing the animated film Monster House with Dan Harmon; producing The Sarah Silverman Program on Comedy Central; writing and producing the unpurchased (but virally reproduced) cult pilot Heat Vision and Jack (also with Harmon); and creating Internet "TV channel" Channel 101, which features user-submitted content. 

Dan Harmon became a Dead Alewife at the same time as Schrab, both having trained under Scholler and Johnson. Harmon was the creator and writer of several Dead Alewives recordings that found some viral Internet success, such as "Dungeons and Dragons" sketch, also known as "Summoner Geeks". In the late 1990s, he moved to Los Angeles with Schrab, where the two launched a career as screenwriting partners. Harmon was the producer, writer, and star of Acceptable.TV on VH1, as well as the creator of the TV series Community and the co-creator of Rick and Morty.

Sean McKenna was a founding member. After the Alewives ceased their live performances, he moved to the Twin Cities to continue his theatrical career, where he became the voice of the Best Buy Idea Box on television commercials and also provided the voice for the titular character in Schrab's Robot Bastard short. Sean became a copywriter and works at an ad agency. He has two children.

Kurt Scholler taught improv classes in Milwaukee while living there, and appeared in a number of television ads for the Cousins sandwich restaurant chain, CapitalOne, and Campbell's Soup. In addition, he has appeared in small roles on a number of television shows, including Kwik Witz, Boston Legal, and The West Wing. Scholler performed the physical role of the robot in Schrab's Robot Bastard short. Still performing with ComedySportz in Los Angeles, Scholler continues to do commercials, film, and television, including a brief cameo on The Sarah Silverman Program.

Other Dead Alewives 

Dylan Bolin is a Milwaukee-based comedian and improv artist who joined the troupe after the departure of some of the original members.

Tom Clark is an actor and a stand-up comedian. He lives in Los Angeles and has acted on such shows as TNT's The Closer, NBC's Outsourced and The Hallmark Movie The Wish List. He has also appeared in Universal Pictures Big Miracle and Columbia Pictures Freaks of Nature. He has done stand up on TBS's Conan, Comedy Central's Premium Blend and CBS's The Late Late Show. He, too, joined after the departure of some of the founding members.

Mark Redlich worked with the Dead Alewives and ComedySportz while finishing his Ph.D in organic chemistry. He lives in Milwaukee, where he works as a chemical analyst, and plays lead guitar in Random Maxx with Bo Johnson. Redlich is still active with ComedySportz.

Eric Price is a comedian and impressionist who did several shows with the Dead Alewives in the stead of the departed founders. Price was a featured performer on MADtv.

Rollie Cafaro is a Milwaukee-area attorney and veteran of ComedySportz who filled in for absent members during a number of shows.

Dungeons and Dragons sketch
	 

	 
Dungeons and Dragons (also known as Summoner Geeks or Attacking the Darkness) was a comedy sketch parodying the Dungeons & Dragons role-playing game experience. It was produced in 1996  by the  Dead Alewives and comes from an album of like sketches titled Take Down the Grand Master. Voice talent was by Dead Alewives members Dan Harmon, Rob Schrab, Peter Alberts and Mondy Carter.

In the 1980s, the role-playing game Dungeons & Dragons reached a peak in popularity. Misunderstandings of its fantasy settings led those glossing over the content of the game to assume that it had elements of the occult, witchcraft, and Satanism, arousing controversy. Written by Harmon, the Dungeons & Dragons sketch parodied these controversies; introducing itself as something of an exposé on the supposed "horrors" the game was "introducing" to children, it instead depicts a fairly mundane game of Dungeons & Dragons among four adolescent boys arguing over minutiae, ending by humorously pinning the blame for their interest in the game on their gym teacher for "making them feel outcast when they couldn't do one single pull-up".

Popular quotes 

 "Where're the Cheetos?!"
	
 "Where's the Mountain Dew?!" / "Can I have a Mountain Dew?!"

 "I wanna cast... Magic Missile!"

 "I'm attacking the darkness!"

 "I am Galstaf, Sorcerer of Light!" / "Then how come you had to cast magic missile?"

 "Roll the dice to see if I'm getting drunk!"

 "Okay, but if there are any girls there, I wanna DO them!"

Connection to Summoner 
	 
In 2000, Volition released a computer animated version of the sketch titled Summoner Geeks.  It was a 3D animation test turned promotional video for the Summoner video game and featured characters from both Summoner and Red Faction. The "Where are the Cheetos?" character was played by an oversized demon, Luminar. The video was included in the game, and can be found by viewing the credits.

References in other media 

 During the sketch, one of the players mentions he has an "ogre-slaying knife" which inflicts "+9 [damage] against ogres!". In tribute to the sketch, ArenaNet added the weapon (complete with its +9 damage modifier against ogres) as a collectable item in the game Guild Wars after clearing a challenging PvE area. In the same area, there is a boss enemy named "The Darkness", which the players have to defeat. Thereby, players can "attack the darkness".

 Blizzard Entertainment has added a quest called I Shoot Magic Into the Darkness to World of Warcraft.

There is an entire questing area within Kingdom of Loathing that parodies this sketch as well as numerous scattered references within the game elsewhere.

There is an Easter egg in the Borderlands 2 DLC Tiny Tina's Assault on Dragon Keep that references this sketch. In one of the later areas, there is a cave full of volumetric darkness, much like many enemy spawners in the game. Unlike those, however, the player can attack and kill The Darkness. Killing it with any attack will make it disappear, revealing a hidden door, but attacking it with the Magic Missile special grenade will open the door and reveal a secret chest. Defeating The Darkness with any attack grants the achievement/trophy "It's Like That One Video", paying specific homage to the Summoner Geeks iteration.

 On "Basic Sandwich," the April 17, 2014 episode of NBC's sitcom Community, Abed wears a Dead Alewives shirt (which he had also worn for part of the previous episode, "Basic Story"). Alewives co-founder Dan Harmon is the executive producer and head writer of Community and Basic Sandwich was directed by Rob Schrab.

References

External links 
 
 
 
 

1980s in comedy
1990s in comedy
American comedy troupes
Culture of Milwaukee
Improvisational troupes